Ravindranath Tiwari was a politician from Faizabad, Uttar Pradesh who was elected for the Katheri Vidhan Sabha constituency. He was a cabinet minister in the government of Uttar Pradesh during the chief ministership of Mulayam Singh Yadav.

Uttar Pradesh politicians
People from Faizabad district
Year of death missing
Year of birth missing